Hoop-La is a 1933 American pre-Code drama film directed by Frank Lloyd, and starring Clara Bow (in her final film role), Preston Foster, Richard Cromwell and Minna Gombell also in the cast. The film is based on the play The Barker by Kenyon Nicholson, which was also filmed in 1928 under the same title as the play.

A version restored by the Museum of Modern Art was shown at the 2011 Classic Film Festival in Hollywood during the spring.

Synopsis
When the sheltered and educated Chris Miller (Richard Cromwell) who is the son of Nifty Miller (Preston Foster), manager of a travelling circus, shows up unexpectedly to visit his dad, Nifty wants him to turn around and go back to school. Nifty is reluctant to let him be around the circus folk. However, he is allowed to stay and work for a while; however, this means some things have to change—like Nifty and his paramour Carrie (Minna Gombell) have to cool it for a while. Carrie doesn't take that at all well, and in anger pays worldly Hoochie coochie dancer Lou (Clara Bow) to seduce Chris and lure him away from his dad. Lou tries her best, and sometimes shocks the naive Chris, like when she goes skinny dipping in a pond.

However, instead of taking him for a chump, she ends up falling in love and comes clean with him; he proposes marriage. Lou thinks she's not good enough for Chris, and so does Nifty. Then Chris and Lou sneak off and get married. Needing money to leave the circus, Lou hits up Carrie for the rest of the money she promised, threatening to tell Nifty if she doesn't pay. They gather enough money to leave, but not before an angry Nifty can throw them out and tell them never to come back. Lou and Chris head for the Chicago and the World's Fair where Lou dances and Chris works in a law office. Having fallen on hard times, Lou secretly arranges for Nifty to be the barker for her dancing act. Lou knows Chris won't be happy until he makes up with his father. Nifty isn't happy; Chris explains that Lou has been making it possible for him to learn the law while she supports them with her dancing. In the end, Nifty realizes Lou is okay and forgives them both.

Cast
Clara Bow - Lou
Preston Foster - Nifty Miller
Richard Cromwell - Chris Miller
Herbert Mundin - Hap Spissel
James Gleason - Jerry
Minna Gombell - Carrie
Roger Imhof - Colonel Gowdy
Florence Roberts - Ma Benson

unbilled
Erville Alderson - The Sheriff
Otis Harlan - Town Councilman, Side Show Customer
Frank Mills - Barker
Frank Moran - Side Show Craps Player
Charles Sellon - The Colonel, Billy's Father

Reception
The film was a box office disappointment for Fox.

Remake
The same story was remade in 1945 as Billy Rose's Diamond Horseshoe starring Betty Grable.

References

External links

 

1933 films
1933 drama films
American black-and-white films
American drama films
Remakes of American films
American films based on plays
Circus films
1930s English-language films
Films directed by Frank Lloyd
Fox Film films
Sound film remakes of silent films
1930s American films